Dag Frogner (29 May 1929 – 5 March 2015) was a Norwegian painter and scenographer.

He was born in Modum, and was educated at the Norwegian National Academy of Craft and Art Industry and the Norwegian National Academy of Fine Arts. He has worked as scenic designer at the theatres Folketeatret, Oslo Nye Teater, Det Norske Teatret, Den Nationale Scene, Riksteatret, Trøndelag Teater and Rogaland Teater. He also worked for NRK for 25 years, from the start of its television era, including for Fjernsynsteatret.

Frogner died on 5 March 2015.

Honours
Prix Italia

References

1929 births
2015 deaths
Norwegian designers
Norwegian scenic designers
NRK people
20th-century Norwegian painters
21st-century Norwegian painters
People from Modum